The Sozialistische Deutsche Studentenbund — the Socialist German Students' Union or Socialist German Students' League — was founded in 1946 in Hamburg, Germany, as the collegiate branch of the Social Democratic Party of Germany (SPD). In the 1950s, tensions between the SDS and the main party surfaced, particularly over the party's support of West Germany's rearming, until the SPD expelled all members of the SDS from the party in 1961.

History 
After its exclusion from the parent organization Social Democratic Party of Germany, the SDS became the leading element in the Außerparlamentarische Opposition (APO; English: Extra Parliamentary Opposition). In late 1966, it became active when the SPD and Christian Democratic Union formed a grand coalition, which left Germany without a strong opposition inside parliament, since members of those two parties represented more than 90% of the seats in the Bundestag. The group consisted mainly of college and university students. The SDS opposed the Vietnam War and Germany's political involvement in it, as well as the use of nuclear weapons; and objected that many former National Socialists (or Nazis) still held influential positions in West Germany. They also wanted to advance democratic structures in all institutions, for example in school. 

In May and June 1967, the Shah Mohammad Reza Pahlavi visited West Germany. On June 2, 1967 in West Berlin, Iranian and German students (including the Socialist German Student Union and Confederation of Iranian Students) protested the Shah's visit, and it resulted in one student dying. 

Alternative lifestyles and more tolerance for same-sex couples, a more open treatment of sexual topics, the right to abortion and equal rights for women are also associated with the APO, and the SDS as its best known representative. The students involved used the same methods of protest as the anti-war movement in the United States at that time, for example sit-ins and demonstrations. The student movement reached its height in 1968 (its membership peaked at 2,500 at that time), after that the influence of the SDS declined. In 1970 it disbanded. A resurrection of the SDS in 1988 proved of no importance.

Important members of the SDS were Helmut Schmidt, later Chancellor of Germany (he was a member while the SDS was still part of the SPD); the later Red Army Faction member Ulrike Meinhof; and Rudi Dutschke.

In 2007, the student organization of the recent German Left Party, Die Linke, adopted the name Die Linke.SDS (Sozialistisch-Demokratischer Studierendenverband) at its founding congress.

Members 
A number of people, which later hold important positions in German society and politics were member of SDS:

 Rudi Dutschke, left-wing activist, died by a nazi attack
 Otto Fichtner, politician (SPD) (SDS chairmen 1955–1956)
 Joschka Fischer, former foreign minister (Alliance 90/The Greens)
 Hajo Funke, political scientist
 Dieter Kunzelmann, left-wing activist
 Ulrike Meinhof, founding-member of Red Army Fraction
 Bernd Rabehl, left-wing activist
 Helmut Schmidt, former chanelor (SPD) (SDS chairmen 1947–1948)
 Fritz Teufel, political activist

See also
German Student Union (1919–1945)

References

Student wings of political parties in Germany
Student wings of social democratic parties
West Germany
Social Democratic Party of Germany
Außerparlamentarische Opposition
1946 establishments in Germany